Ole Mogens Espersen (20 December 1934 – 4 December 2020) was a Danish politician and minister, who represented the Social Democratic Party in Denmark. 

Espersen was born in Nylars. He was Minister of Justice during two cabinets of Anker Jørgensen in the 1980s. He was Professor, dr.jur. In 1994–2000 he was the Commissioner on democratic institutions and human rights, including the rights of persons belonging to minorities, of CBSS.

References

External links 
 Den Store Danske 

1934 births
2020 deaths
Danish Justice Ministers
Danish jurists
Social Democrats (Denmark) politicians
Academic staff of the University of Copenhagen